is a Japanese manga series written and illustrated by Mochi. It was adapted into an anime television series in 2013.

Plot
The story revolves around Hiroshi Inaba, a genetically altered part human and part wolf being. Inaba is also a private detective, who runs his agency with the help of his cross-dressing secretary, Yuuta and his "mostly normal" teenager assistant Kei. The plot mostly centers around the gang trying to arrest Don Valentino, an evil goat who eats money.

Characters

Detective Inaba Office

 (drama CD), Junichi Suwabe (anime, present), Natsumi Takamori (anime, young)
A genetically altered being made from the spliced genes of human and wolf, he is also a private detective. He gains information by examining and tasting people's hair. As a result from this, he has a hair fetish. Hiroshi can also transform into a more wolf-like form and can use special powers and attacks from whatever type or color of hair he eats. Just like Sōmei he can transform into a wolf, him being red. Formerly, he worked for the police but quit and formed his own detective agency after his younger brother, Haruka, left. His former partner is Kuniharu Ogino. He still continues to help him in cases, ones that involve the Valentino Family. It is stated and shown throughout the series that he has a brother complex towards his younger brother. He spoils Haruka because of his weak body and is often blind to his usual villainous aura. His biological father is Sōmei, as his half-wolf DNA is originally from Sōmei.

 (drama CD), Miyu Irino (anime)
A 16-year-old boy who is also an assistant to Inaba. He is the "mostly normal" and the straight man of the agency. It is mentioned that he was very poor growing up, once residing in a small wooden house with his parents. Even with Hiroshi paying him 900¥ per-hour, he is still plagued by money problems. He is a cat lover, but has a cat allergy, making him only able to own Spynx because the cat doesn't have fur. Kei is also able to release incredible willpower, although only given decent motivation. Examples of this would be expelling the "Black Fang" from his body due to his addiction to cats and the ability to exponentially improve his table tennis skills when angered by the Don's foolishness. He is usually the one who is caught up with Yūta's plots to kill Kuniharu Ogino and even Haruka Inaba for getting to close to Hiroshi. Mostly he does his best to stop Yūta from killing anyone that gets to close with Hiroshi. He's in his freshman year at a nearby high school.

 (drama CD), Asami Shimoda (anime)
A cross-dressing young boy who serves as Inaba's secretary. He hates Ogino to the point of wanting to kill him. Yūta pretends to be the stereotypical cute anime girl. However to everyone that he dislikes or views as an enemy, for time with Hiroshi, he shows his sadistic side. This is especially true as he wants to kill Kuniharu Ogino, Hiroshi's past partner. This is due to Yūta jealousy of Ogino and Hiroshi's relationship of mutual trust. He is only affectionate and shows protectiveness over Hiroshi but Hiroshi does not realize this or may just be choosing to ignore it, as Hiroshi treats Yūta as his little sister. He later shows protectiveness over Noah. Yūta and Noah instantly bonded over their similar personalities and mutual desire to kill Ogino. Despite technically being enemies, Yūta and Noah remain to be enthusiastic in each other's company and are shown to text frequently. Yūta is proficient in martial arts. It is implied that Yūta has a crush on Hiroshi and later Noah.

Police Officer

 (drama CD), Toshiyuki Morikawa (anime)
A top inspector with the police force. He was partnered with Inaba, back when he was with the police. He is still good friends with Inaba and usually seeks their assistance in several cases. He has a daughter named Azusa he overprotective with and willing to do anything just to see her cuteness, just as when he conquered a giant goat so he can take a picture of it with Azusa.

 (drama CD), Kōsuke Toriumi (anime)
A detective known to solve cases quickly. He used to dote on Inaba due to his extreme love for dogs, which makes Inaba prone to stay away. When Inaba was still with the police force, together with most of the police dogs, would often go to strike due to his annoying attitude towards them.

 (drama CD), Ai Fukada (anime)
From the same agency as Inaba, Stella is also a wolf/human hybrid and appears to be a young teenage girl. Paired with Ogata, she gains a taste for flesh elasticity during her first outing in the field. She has a misunderstanding with Ogino for being a bad man because of his relationship with Ogata.

Mafia Valentino Family

 (drama CD), Tōru Ōkawa (anime)
A goat who is known for being head of a mafia, making counterfeiting bills, while collecting real ones to eat. He hates wolves in general because of the affairs in the past of two creatures.

 (drama CD), Jūrōta Kosugi (anime)
The assistant to Don Valentino. Wears old Japanese clothes and a burlap sack on his head. He really protective with Don in the point he might be in love with him. When Lorenzo is not wearing his mask he has short wavy brown hair, dark green eyes, and even sports a five o'clock shadow.

, Yōko Hikasa (anime)
A hitwoman employed by Valentino with a size fetish. She becomes infatuated with Kei as he's her ideal minion size.

 (drama CD), Yuiko Tatsumi (anime)
A 14 years old mad scientist, Noah makes all of the Don's gadgets, potions, and monsters. Noah speaks in Kansai dialect. She has a fetish for youthful bodies and capturing their perfection in death. Finding Ogi to be an ideal specimen, Noah befriends Yuta as they both aspire to his demise.

NORA

 (drama CD), Mitsuki Saiga (anime)
Hiroshi's younger brother who disappeared two years ago With Jose. He has white hair and red eyes and is often said to look like a white rabbit. Despite him being a terrorist, he is still attached to his brother. He too has a brother complex towards his brother. To the point where he want to destroy the Japanese police department because it takes too much of his brother's time. He has a weak body and is very lazy, stating that he is a pro at being lazy. Haruka refers to Hiroshi as "Nii-ni" and apparently can't look at red things without seeing his brother. He is the 'head' of NORA. It is hinted that besides wanting to destroy the police, so that his brother will not ever chose them over him, that he has another reason for being in NORA. His power is the ability to hear a person's thoughts, including their most inner thoughts [including those you did not even know you had]. He too is said be able to transform into a wolf, just like Sōmei and Hiroshi but usually the transformation only drains his energy.

 
Sōmei was a former police dog, known as the "Black Fang", who was arrested over the suicide of his partner, Joji. They spent 18 years working together. He remembers Joji as a man who 'yelled a lot'. He now mainly resides in a sheep-sized doll, as the unofficial head of NORA. Due to a special power of his he was able to leave his body and began to take numerous hosts. His current host is sometimes Yatarō, who was personally trained for such a task. Sōmei is the biological father of both Hiroshi Inaba and Haruka Inaba. The old lot left following Sōmei's arrest. Sōmei is fairly perverted, often trying to molest Natsuki. He is also laid-back, but can be as a diabolic, as seen when he plans to kill Ogino, who he knows to be the grandson of Joji, despite the latter having made no offense. He is currently looking for his body. His wolf/human hybrid ability is to be able to tell if a person is lying just by their scent.

 (drama CD), Asami Seto (anime)
The only female member of NORA. She is a wolf/human hybrid, with the ability to read a person's mind just by holding their hand. Natsuki and Yatarō are childhood friends. She worries for Haruka because of his weak body, and Yatarō when Soumei possesses him. She has feelings for Yatarō, as shown when she became jealous during his date with Noah.

 (drama CD), Tomokazu Sugita (anime)
He is a wolf/human hybrid who is a member of NORA. He was personally trained by Sōmei to be his host. Like Soumei, he has the ability to tell if a person is lying just by their scent, a power which also extends to objects. Because he is Sōmei's body host, he doesn't speak much. Yatarō and Natsuki are childhood friends. It is hinted that he returns Natsuki's feelings.

 (anime)
Akiyoshi is Sōmei's former vessel before Yatarō. He is now imprisoned in non-human prison.

Others

 (drama CD), Satoshi Hino (anime)
Iori is a bartender who works in a bar called Ragdoll. He is also Kei's roommate.

 (drama CD), Ryōta Takeuchi (anime)

 (anime)
A mysterious character that appeared in the last episode. He calls himself "Forest Masashi".

 (anime)
Kunihiro's five year old daughter. She is shown to be quite the dynamic type, being able to drag Inaba off his feet as she runs around with a leash. She also enjoys playing games, though often to the extreme.

 (anime)
Kunihiro's wife and Azusa's mother. She is very kind and calm, easily suppressing the Don's rage, but accidentally gaining the dislike of Lorenzo. She shows that she is not bothered by her husband's lack of affection, and continues to try to get him to be affectionate shown when she tries to get a kiss from him in episode 2. According to her husband, she is said to have no sense of danger much to his worry.

Media

Manga
A special chapter was published in the magazine on March 18, 2017. Square Enix collected its chapters in nineteen tankōbon volumes, released from March 27, 2008, to June 27, 2017.

Anime

Episode list

References

External links
 Official manga website 
 Official anime website 
 

2013 anime television series debuts
Adventure anime and manga
Anime series based on manga
AT-X (TV network) original programming
Comedy anime and manga
Detective anime and manga
Gangan Comics manga
Sentai Filmworks
Shōnen manga
Square Enix franchises
Supernatural anime and manga
Tokyo MX original programming
Zexcs